State Road 204 (NM 204) is a  gravel state highway in the US state of New Mexico. NM 204's southern terminus at U.S. Route 64 (US 64) just north of Cimarron, and it the northern terminus at the gate at the southern end of Ponil Campsite on the grounds of the Philmont Scout Ranch in Colfax County. This campsite was formerly the Ranch headquarters, from its inception in 1938 until shortly after its 1941 expansion, when it was moved to its present location south of Cimarron.  The road is primarily used by Philmont busses transporting Scouts into and out of the Ranch's North Country at Six Mile Gate and the Ponil Turnaround. The Highway was never paved because the old owner of philmont was afraid people would speed down the Highway and hit their cattle.

Major intersections

References

204
Gravel roads